CFJB-FM is a Canadian radio station, broadcasting at 95.7 FM in Barrie, Ontario. The station broadcasts an active rock format branded as "Rock 95".

Owned by Central Ontario Broadcasting (Rock 95 Broadcasting (Barrie-Orillia) Ltd.), the station launched on October 7, 1988. CFJB can be heard as far south as Mississauga, and as far north as Parry Sound. It cannot be heard in the southeast due to adjacent station CJKX-FM broadcasting on 95.9 FM

The call letters once belonged to a Brampton radio station, in the 1950s.

On May 7, 2012, CFJB's owners (Central Ontario Broadcasting) were granted permission to launch a sister station in Toronto on 88.1 MHz, CIND-FM.

References

External links
Rock 95 website

Fjb
Fjb
Radio stations established in 1988
1988 establishments in Ontario